Turraeanthus africanus is a species of plant in the family Meliaceae, also known by the common names avodiré, apeya, engan, agbe, lusamba, wansenwa, African satinwood, and African white mahogany.

Nomenclature
Although the species epithet given by François Pellegrin in the first publication is africana, it should be amended into masculine form, i.e. africanus per the ICN (ed. 2017, Art. 62.2 (c)): "Compounds ending in ‑ceras, ‑dendron, ‑nema, ‑stigma, ‑stoma, and other neuter words, are neuter. An exception is made for names ending in ‑anthos (or ‑anthus), ‑chilos (‑chilus or ‑cheilos), and ‑phykos (‑phycos or ‑phycus), which ought to be neuter, because that is the gender of the Greek words άνθος, anthos, χείλος, cheilos, and φύκος, phykos, but are treated as masculine in accordance with tradition."

Description
The species is found in Angola, Benin, Cameroon, the Democratic Republic of the Congo, Ivory Coast, Equatorial Guinea, Ghana, Nigeria, Sierra Leone, and Uganda. The genus name is derived from the botanist Turra (1607-1688) of Padua, Italy and arithos, a Greek word meaning flower.

Turraeanthus africanus is described as a tree of the rain forest, typically, 115 ft. (35m), and having a trunk diameter of 2 to 3 ft. (0.6-0.9m).  The wood of this tree has a specific gravity of 0.48. It is commonly creamy white or pale yellow but will darken upon exposure to ultra-violet light to a golden yellow color.  It has an interlocked wood grain producing various figures: striped, curly, or mottled.

Uses
Avodire wood has long been valued in furniture for its naturally lustrous surface, which has led to the name African Satinwood. Commonly, the highly figured wood is used for veneers in panelling and marquetry.

A preparation from the bark of this plant is used by Baka people in southeastern Cameroon to stun fish.

Conservation
It listed on the IUCN Red List as vulnerable, and is threatened by habitat loss.

References

africanus
Trees of Africa
Flora of Angola
Flora of Benin
Flora of Cameroon
Flora of the Democratic Republic of the Congo
Flora of Ivory Coast
Flora of Equatorial Guinea
Flora of Ghana
Flora of Nigeria
Flora of Sierra Leone
Flora of Uganda
Vulnerable flora of Africa
Taxonomy articles created by Polbot
Taxobox binomials not recognized by IUCN